Alf Boe may refer to:

 Alf Bøe (1927–2010), Norwegian art historian
 Alfie Boe (born 1973), English tenor

See also
 Boe (disambiguation)